Herman Humwa (8 November 1995) is a Kenyan rugby sevens player who represents Kenya internationally. He made his Olympic debut representing Kenya at the 2020 Summer Olympics.

He was named in the Kenyan squad for the men's rugby sevens tournament at the 2020 Summer Olympics. He competed for Kenya at the 2022 Rugby World Cup Sevens in Cape Town.

References 

  
1995 births
Living people
Kenya international rugby sevens players
Olympic rugby sevens players of Kenya
Rugby sevens players at the 2020 Summer Olympics
Rugby sevens players at the 2022 Commonwealth Games